Joshua Hobson (1810–1876) was a British Chartist and Tory Radical  who was the first publisher of the Book of Murder, a pamphlet attacking the 1834 Poor Law Amendment Act. In 1838-1844 he was the publisher of the Chartist newspaper Northern Star.

Early life

Hobson was born in 1810 in Huddersfield, Yorkshire, there he was apprenticed as a joiner before working as a handloom weaver in nearby Oldham, Lancashire. During this time he wrote for radical papers as “the whistler at the loom”.

Political activity
Hobson was associated with the Tory radical Richard Oastler.  He was elected to the first Central Committee of the National Association of United Trades for the Protection of Labour in 1845. In Leeds he established himself as a Radical publisher and printer, in Market Street, Briggate and this is described as “important in the history of radical, especially Owenite and Chartist publishing”.

Publishing activity
After publishing the Book of Murder Hobson was imprisoned for publishing further pamphlets. He was publisher and business manager of the Northern Star, the campaigning newspaper at the head of Chartism. This advocated the abolition of the Poor Law Amendment Act and a renewal of the Ten Hours Movement and trade union movement, as well as the six points of the People's Charter.

In January 1836 Hobson, alongside publisher Alice Mann, was fined (£100 for Mann and £80 for Hobson). In default of payment they were imprisoned in York Castle for six months. From 1855 to 1871 he was the editor of the Conservative-supporting newspaper the Huddersfield Chronicle.

References

Further reading
Chase, Malcolm (2007).Chartism: A New History
Cordery, Simon (1988).'Joshua Hobson', Dictionary of Labour Biography, ed. Joyce Bellamy and John Saville
Epstein, James (1976).‘Feargus O’Connor and the Northern Star’, International Review of Social History 21
Chadwick Stanley(1976) A Bold and Faithful Journalist, Kirklees Metropolitan Council, Libraries and Museums Service
Halstead, John (2018), "'The Charter and Something More!' The Politics of Joshua Hobson, 1810-1876)", The Charter Our Right! Huddersfield Chartism Re-Considered, ed. J. Hargreaves, Huddersfield Local History Society

External links
Victorianweb.org article on Hobson
(

1810 births
1876 deaths
English prisoners and detainees
British publishers (people)
English socialists
Chartists
People from Huddersfield
Poor Law in Britain and Ireland
English trade unionists
19th-century British businesspeople